Wattle Hill is a locality and small rural community in the local government area of Sorell, in the Sorell and surrounds region of Tasmania. The 2016 census determined a population of 187 for the state suburb of Wattle Hill.

History
The locality name was gazetted in 1972.

Road infrastructure
The C331 route (Nugent Road) runs north-east from the Arthur Highway through the locality, providing access to many other localities. The C332 route (Shrub End Road) enters the locality from Pawleena in the north-west and intersects with the C331, while the C333 route (Delmore Road) runs north from the Arthur Highway and also intersects with the C331.

References

East Coast Tasmania
Towns in Tasmania
Localities of Sorell Council